General elections were held in Haiti on 17 January 1988, after the 1987 general election had been cancelled due to an election day massacre of voters either orchestrated or condoned by the Haitian military. The elections were boycotted by most candidates who had contested the previous elections, and while the official voter turnout figure was stated to be around 35%, observers and foreign officials estimated it to be no more than 10%, with some putting it at lower than 4%.

The official results were made public on 24 January, and it was a victory for Leslie Manigat of the Rally of Progressive National Democrats. However, six months later, he was removed from office in a military coup on 20 June.

Results

President

References

1988 in Haiti
Haiti
Elections in Haiti
Presidential elections in Haiti
Election and referendum articles with incomplete results